The Sabine-Southwestern War was a military conflict in the United States from 1836 to 1837. It was a war with Native Americans in Louisiana along the Sabine River, the border between the Republic of Texas and the United States.

References

Wars between the United States and Native Americans
History of United States expansionism